Godwin's law, short for Godwin's law (or rule) of Nazi analogies, is an Internet adage asserting that as an online discussion grows longer (regardless of topic or scope), the probability of a comparison to Nazis or Adolf Hitler approaches 1. 

Promulgated by the American attorney and author Mike Godwin in 1990, Godwin's law originally referred specifically to Usenet newsgroup discussions. He stated that he introduced Godwin's law in 1990 as an experiment in memetics. Later it was applied to any threaded online discussion, such as Internet forums, chat rooms, and comment threads, as well as to speeches, articles, and other rhetoric where reductio ad Hitlerum occurs.

In 2012, Godwin's law became an entry in the third edition of the Oxford English Dictionary. In 2021, Harvard researchers published an article showing the phenomenon does not occur with statistically meaningful frequency in Reddit discussions.

Generalization, corollaries, and usage
There are many corollaries to Godwin's law, some considered more canonical (by being adopted by Godwin himself) than others. For example, there is a tradition in many newsgroups and other Internet discussion forums that, when a Hitler comparison is made, the thread is finished and whoever made the comparison loses whatever debate is in progress. This principle is itself frequently referred to as Godwin's law.

Godwin's law itself can be applied mistakenly or abused as a distraction, diversion or even as censorship, when fallaciously miscasting an opponent's argument as hyperbole when the comparison made by the argument is appropriate. Godwin himself has also criticized the overapplication of the law, claiming that it does not articulate a fallacy, but rather is intended to reduce the frequency of inappropriate and hyperbolic comparisons. Godwin wrote that "Although deliberately framed as if it were a law of nature or of mathematics, its purpose has always been rhetorical and pedagogical: I wanted folks who glibly compared someone else to Hitler to think a bit harder about the Holocaust."

In December 2015, Godwin commented on comparisons to Nazism and fascism being made by several articles between Republican presidential candidate Donald Trump, saying: "If you're thoughtful about it and show some real awareness of history, go ahead and refer to Hitler when you talk about Trump, or any other politician." In August 2017, Godwin made similar remarks on social media with respect to the two previous days' Unite the Right rally in Charlottesville, Virginia, endorsing and encouraging comparisons of its alt-right organizers to Nazis.

In June 2018, Godwin wrote an opinion piece in the Los Angeles Times denying the need to update or amend the rule. He rejected the idea that whoever invokes Godwin's law has lost the argument, and argued that, applied appropriately, the rule "should function less as a conversation ender and more as a conversation starter."

In March 2022, Godwin wrote "you're not going to believe who this guy reminds me of" about Vladimir Putin, actually using his own rule.

In February of 2023 Microsoft Bing was reported to have compared a journalist to Hitler, thus extending Godwin's Law to large language models.

See also

 Poe's law
 Association fallacy
 List of eponymous laws
 Nazi analogies
 Goebbels Gap
 Straw man
 Think of the children
 Thought-terminating cliché
 Toothbrush moustache § Post–World War II

References

Further reading

External links

 
 "I Seem to be a Verb" ; Mike Godwin's commentary on the 18th anniversary of Godwin's law
 "My Nazi Can Beat Up Your Nazi" by Michael Sietzman
 
 
 Interview with "Mike Godwin on Godwin's Law" by Dan Amira, New York magazine, March 8, 2013
 Wired 2.10; Meme, Counter-Meme by Mike Godwin

1990 neologisms
Adages
Adolf Hitler
Eponyms
Genetic fallacies
Internet culture
Internet terminology
Internet trolling
Nazi analogies
Political Internet memes
Principles